Hato Mayor may refer to:

 Hato Mayor Province
 Hato Mayor del Rey